Euxanthe is a genus of butterflies in the subfamily Charaxinae.

Species
There are six species all found in Afrotropical forests. The popular name is forest queen.

Subgenus Euxanthe Hübner, [1819]
Euxanthe crossleyi (Ward, 1871)
Euxanthe eurinome (Cramer, [1775])
Euxanthe madagascariensis (Lucas, 1843)
Euxanthe wakefieldi (Ward, 1873)
Subgenus Hypomelaena Aurivillius, [1898]
Euxanthe tiberius Grose-Smith, 1889
Euxanthe trajanus (Ward, 1871)

External links

TOL
"Euxanthe Hübner, [1819]" at Markku Savela's Lepidoptera and Some Other Life Forms
Barcodes of Life Images
Seitz, A. Die Gross-Schmetterlinge der Erde 13: Die Afrikanischen Tagfalter. Plate XIII 29

Charaxinae
Nymphalidae genera
Taxa named by Jacob Hübner